The Gilman Manse is an historic home at 463 Lafayette Street in Yarmouth, Maine. It succeeded the Cutter House, at 60 Gilman Road, as the parsonage for the church.

In 1905, John Calvin Stevens was hired to undertake a renovation of the property.

It was the home of Arthur E. Marks (1853–1917) in 1911, and of Merrill and Grace Haskell from 1928.

See also 
 Historical buildings and structures of Yarmouth, Maine

References

External links 

 464 Lafayette Street - Vision Government Solutions

Residential buildings in Yarmouth, Maine
Houses completed in 1771
Clergy houses in the United States